The Other Sides – Elvis Worldwide Gold Award Hits Vol. 2 is a compilation album by American singer and musician Elvis Presley released on August 1, 1971. It was certified Gold on July 15, 1999 by the Recording Industry Association of America. Only six tracks had never been officially released in LP format prior to this release:  "Let Me", "Tell Me Why", the single (studio) versions of "Patch it Up" and "I've Lost You", the undubbed version of "Lover Doll", and the title song for Wild in the Country.

As a promotion, the initial release of this set included a small swath of fabric purported to come from Presley's outfits.

Track listing

References

External links

The Other Sides - Elvis Worldwide Gold Award Hits Vol. 2 - Sergent.com.au

Elvis Presley compilation albums
1971 compilation albums
RCA Records compilation albums